Parliamentary elections were held in Vietnam on 22 May 2011. Since Vietnam is a single-party state, the ruling Communist Party of Vietnam was guaranteed to win a majority.

Campaign
According to the Ministry of Home Affairs, there were 827 candidates. 31.4% were women, 14.3% were not members of the Communist Party, 16.1% were members of ethnic minorities and 22.1% were candidates running for reelection. Regardless of party standing, all candidates are evaluated by the Fatherland Front.

Originally, 82 people were self-nominated, but of those only 15 were approved by party officials in order to run in the election. However, Vietnam saw an increase of self-nominated candidates (82) in 2011 compared to 30 in 2007. Some pro-democracy and human rights activists were a part of the self-nominated group, who did not receive the required approval. These included lawyers Le Quoc Quan, a former fellow for the National Endowment for Democracy and Cu Huy Ha Vu and Le Cong Dinh, both sentenced to jail for security and propaganda risks against the state.

The 14 politburo seats were also up for election, though these elections were held in small electoral districts chosen by the party leaders. Thus, not all Vietnamese voters had a say in the politburo election decision.

Results
During the 2011 election, Vietnam had an estimated 62,200,000 registered voters and of those registered 61,900,000 ballots were reportedly cast. Voter turnout was exceedingly high at 99.51%. Of the 500 members elected, 333 were first-time members and four were self-nominated. Almost all of them had at least a bachelor's degree; 15.6% were from ethnic minorities, 24.4% were women, and 8.4% were not members of the Communist Party. Non-party members, who managed to gain a seat in the National Assembly, include brother and sister duo Dang Thanh Tam and Dang Thi Hoang Yen from Saigon Investment Group.

Aftermath
Following the elections, on 25 July the new National Assembly elected Trương Tấn Sang as the new president, with 483 of the 496 National Assembly members voting for him.

References

Elections in Vietnam
Vietnam
2011 in Vietnam
Election and referendum articles with incomplete results